Qaleh Sefid-e Sofla (also Romanized as Qal‘eh Sefīd-e Soflá; also known as Qal‘eh Sefīd-e Pā’īn) is a village in Qaleh Shahin Rural District, in the Central District of Sarpol-e Zahab County, Kermanshah Province, Iran. At the 2006 census, its population was 207, in 46 families.

References 

Populated places in Sarpol-e Zahab County